Mary Bridge Children's Hospital is a pediatric hospital located in Tacoma, Washington. It is an 82-bed facility and a state-designated level II pediatric trauma center.  Mary Bridge was established in 1955 by members of Tacoma Orthopedic Association, a women's volunteer group established in 1921.  Members of the Tacoma Orthopedic Association saw a need for a specialized pediatric health care center in Tacoma.  Key funding came from the estate of Dr. Albert W. Bridge, a physician who practiced in Eatonville, Washington and later also opened a clinic in Tacoma. The hospital was named for his mother, Mary. 

Mary Bridge is physically connected with Tacoma General Hospital and both hospitals are owned and operated by MultiCare Health System, a Tacoma-based not-for-profit integrated health organization. Consequently, Mary Bridge and Tacoma General cooperate extensively and share resources with each other. Mary Bridge is affiliated with the University of Washington and is an active teaching site for medical students.  It also has a joint pediatric heart surgery program with Seattle Children's hospital.

Facilities
Mary Bridge has 82 licensed beds.  It has a 13-bed pediatric intensive care unit (PICU) and a 65-bed neonatal intensive care unit (NICU).  In 2004, a $67 million surgery center was added to the Mary Bridge campus.  In 2005, the outpatient center moved into a new facilities.

Volume of health care services
In 2007, Mary Bridge Children's Hospital had 3,990 medical and surgical inpatient admissions, 359 pediatric intensive care unit admissions, performed 5,392 surgeries, received 30,147 emergency department visits, and 41,055 outpatient clinic visits.

References

Hospital buildings completed in 1955
Children's hospitals in the United States
Hospitals established in 1955
Hospitals in Washington (state)
Buildings and structures in Tacoma, Washington
1955 establishments in Washington (state)

Pediatric trauma centers